Paul-Émile Bécat (2 February 1885 – 1 January 1960 in Paris) was a French painter, printmaker and engraver, and was awarded first prize in the Prix de Rome in 1920. He was a student of Gabriel Ferrier and François Flameng and exhibitioned at the Salon de Paris in 1913. Returning from his travels to the Congo, Gabon, and the Sudan, he specialised from 1933 in the technique of drypoint in his erotic works.
Today he is best known for his portraits of French writers, and for his erotic works.

Illustrative Work
Pierre Louÿs, Aphrodite: mœurs antiques
Pietro Aretino, Ragionamenti
Brantôme, Vie des dames galantes
Pierre Choderlos de Laclos, Les Liaisons dangereuses
Paul Verlaine, Les amies
François-Mathieu Mathieu-François Pidansat de Mairobert, La secte des anandrynes
Voltaire, Le Taureau Blanc, La princesse de Babylone (1951)

External links
Bibliography Illustrated books by Bécat
 Illustrations by Bécat Spanish
"Seeing Africa" 2006 Tate Britain exhibition, supported by BP.

1885 births
1960 deaths
20th-century engravers
French engravers
20th-century French painters
20th-century French male artists
French male painters
20th-century French printmakers